Khambi is a large village of Sarai Alamgir Tehsil, district Gujrat, Pakistan. It is bounded on two sides by the river Jhelum and Upper Canal Jhelum and on the other two sides by small streams.

Education 
There is a Government Elementary School located in Khambi and also a government school.

 Noble Public high school, Alhijaz high school and Alamgir public high school.

References 

Populated places in Gujrat District